The 1900 Purdue Boilermakers football team was an American football team that represented Purdue University during the 1900 Western Conference football season. The Boilermakers compiled a 4–4 record and outscored their opponents by a total of 172 to 79 in their third season under head coach Alpha Jamison. Edward C. Robertson was the team captain.

Schedule

References

Purdue
Purdue Boilermakers football seasons
Purdue Boilermakers football